The Rock River is a tributary of the Mississippi River, approximately  long, in the U.S. states of Wisconsin and Illinois. The river was known as the Sinnissippi to Sauk and Fox Indians; the name means "rocky waters".

The river, which has a notable higher western bank, begins with three separate branches which flow into the Horicon Marsh. The northernmost branch, the West Branch, begins just to the west of the village of Brandon in Fond du Lac County, Wisconsin and flows east and then south to Horicon Marsh. The South Branch rises north of Fox Lake in Dodge County and flows east through Waupun to the marsh. The East Branch rises southeast of Allenton in Washington County just west of the Niagara Escarpment, and flows north and west through Theresa to the marsh.

Leaving the marsh, it meanders southward to the Illinois border, ending about 300 miles later at the Mississippi River at the Quad Cities in Illinois and Iowa. During its course it passes through Watertown, collects the Crawfish River in Jefferson, and receives the Bark River at Fort Atkinson. Shortly before merging, the Rock and Crawfish rivers cross Interstate 94. Both rivers flood the nearby land regularly, and lanes on I-94 were temporarily closed in 2008 because of this flooding.

In northern Rock County, Wisconsin, it receives the Yahara River, and flows southward through tiny Fulton, Janesville and Beloit into northern Illinois, where it receives the Pecatonica River 5 miles (8 km) south of the state line. It flows south through Rockford, then southwest across northwestern Illinois, picking up the Kishwaukee River, passing Oregon, Dixon, Sterling (which has the Sinnissippi Mounds national historic site and local park) and Rock Falls before joining the Mississippi at Rock Island. It was on the Rock River in Dixon where Ronald Reagan was a lifeguard. Reagan's favorite fishing spot, now called "Dutch Landing" after Reagan's nickname, was just southwest of Lowell Park on the Rock River.

There are 25 dams on the Rock River. These are in Theresa (WI, 3 dams), Waupun (WI), Horicon (WI), Mayville (WI, 2 dams), Kekoskee (WI), Hustisford (WI), Watertown (WI, 2 dams), Jefferson (WI, 4 dams), Indianford (WI), Janesville (WI), Beloit (WI), Rockton (IL), Rockford Fordham (IL), Oregon (IL), Dixon (IL), Sterling / Rock Falls (IL, 2 dams), Milan (IL) and Rock Island (IL).

The river is used for various water and paddling sports. The Rock River Water Trail is on the river from its headwaters above the Horicon National Wildlife Refuge in south central Wisconsin to the confluence with the Mississippi River at the Quad Cities of Illinois and Iowa 330 miles downriver. It crosses five counties in Wisconsin, six counties in Illinois and runs through 37 municipalities. The slow moving river passes scenic rural landscapes, wilderness areas and urban areas. The first two trailheads are at Waupun County Park in Waupun, Wisconsin and Rivers Edge Park in Theresa, Wisconsin and there are 32 additional access points in Dodge County, Wisconsin. The trail is part of the National Water Trails System and the first National Water Trail in Wisconsin and Illinois.

Rock River Park is on County Road B about a half mile west of Johnson Creek, Wisconsin in Jefferson County, Wisconsin and offers river access and an artesian spring.

Cities and villages along the river

Communities listed from north to south.

Brandon, Wisconsin (West Branch)
Waupun, Wisconsin (South Branch)
Theresa, Wisconsin (East Branch)
Mayville, Wisconsin (East Branch)
Kekoskee, Wisconsin (East Branch)
Horicon, Wisconsin
Hustisford, Wisconsin
Ixonia, Wisconsin
Watertown, Wisconsin
Johnson Creek, Wisconsin
Jefferson, Wisconsin
Fort Atkinson, Wisconsin
Indianford, Wisconsin
Fulton, Wisconsin
Janesville, Wisconsin
Afton, Wisconsin
Beloit, Wisconsin
South Beloit, Illinois
Rockton, Illinois
Roscoe, Illinois
Machesney Park, Illinois
Loves Park, Illinois
Rockford, Illinois
Byron, Illinois
Oregon, Illinois
Grand Detour, Illinois
Dixon, Illinois
Sterling, Illinois
Rock Falls, Illinois
Lyndon, Illinois
Prophetstown, Illinois
Erie, Illinois
Hillsdale, Illinois
Cleveland, Illinois
Colona, Illinois
Moline, Illinois
Coal Valley, Illinois
Milan, Illinois
Rock Island, Illinois

See also

List of Illinois rivers
List of Wisconsin rivers

References

External links
 Rock River Trail

Rivers of Illinois
Rivers of Wisconsin
Tributaries of the Mississippi River
Rivers of Dodge County, Wisconsin
Rivers of Jefferson County, Wisconsin
Rivers of Rock County, Wisconsin
Rivers of Winnebago County, Illinois
Rivers of Ogle County, Illinois
Rivers of Lee County, Illinois
Rivers of Whiteside County, Illinois
Rivers of Rock Island County, Illinois